The 1994 UCI Road World Cup was the sixth edition of the UCI Road World Cup. It was won by Italian classics specialist Gianluca Bortolami of the  team.

Races

Final standings

Individuals

Teams

References

External links
Complete results from Cyclingbase.com
 Final classification for individuals and teams from memoire-du-cyclisme.eu

 
 
UCI Road World Cup (men)